Grimes Creek is a stream in Boise County, in the U.S. state of Idaho.

Grimes Creek was named for George Grimes, a prospector in 1862. George Grimes was killed by Indians near the stream's course.

See also
List of rivers of Idaho

References

Rivers of Boise County, Idaho
Rivers of Idaho